Letsholathebe Memorial Hospital is a government-run district hospital located in Maun, is the fifth largest town in Botswana. As of 2011, it had a population of 55,784. Maun is the "tourism capital" of Botswana and the administrative centre of Ngamiland district.

History 
Letsholathebe Memorial hospital is established in September 2008 by the government of Botswana. The institution serves the public community in Botswana. It operates under leadership of chief medical officer Mr. Richard Kambinda.

References

External links 
Botswana Ministry of Health

Hospital buildings completed in 2008
Hospitals in Botswana
Hospitals established in 2008